ALKS may refer to:

 Alkermes (company), biopharmaceutical company, traded on the NASDAQ as ALKS
 Automated Lane Keeping Systems, automated/autonomous vehicle regulations